Garor (also known as Garvar) is a village in Gavork-e Nalin Rural District, Vazineh District, Sardasht County, West Azerbaijan Province, Iran. At the 2006 census, its population was 234, in 40 families.

Tourist Attractions
Every year a large number of people from other parts of Iran and other countries, comes to Garor.

Tribes
The tribes  of Garor includes Khezri, Rasooli, Ahmadali, Ahmadani, Sorani, Gedrouni, Mohammadzadegan, Alizadeh, Pasandideh, Kabiri, Aboubakri, Hassani, Osmani, Hassanzade, Ahmadi and Hoveyda

References 

Populated places in Sardasht County